Pyrausta plinthinalis is a moth in the family Crambidae. It was described by Charles Swinhoe in 1907. It is found on Sumatra in Indonesia.

References

Moths described in 1907
plinthinalis
Moths of Indonesia